The first season of the Russian TV show The Voice was broadcast on the Channel One from 5 October 2012 to 29 December 2012.

Coaches

Teams
 Colour key

Blind auditions
Color key

Episode 1 (5 October) 
The coaches performed "Let It Be" at the start of the show.

Episode 2 (12 October)

Episode 3 (19 October)

Episode 4 (26 October)

Episode 5 (2 November)

Episode 6 (9 November)

The Battles

The Battles round started with episode 7 and ended with episode 9 (broadcast on November 16, 23, 30, 2016).
Contestants who win their battle will advance to the Knockout rounds.

Colour key

The Knockouts 
The Knockouts round was broadcast on 7 December 2012.

The top 12 contestants will then move on to the "Live Shows".
Colour key

Live shows
Colour key:

Week 1: Quarterfinal (14 December) 
The Top 12 performed on Friday, 14 December 2012. The one artist with the fewest votes from the each team left the competition by the end of the night.

Week 2: Semifinal (21 December) 
The Top 8 performed on Friday, 21 December 2012. The one artist with the fewest votes from the each team left the competition.

Week 3: Final (29 December) 
The Top 4 performed on Friday, 29 December 2012. This week, the four finalists performed one solo cover songs and two duets with star and with their coach.

Reception

Rating

References

The Voice (Russian TV series)
2012 Russian television seasons